Alexander Guem (born 6 March 1977) is a former Austrian football player. He spent most of his career playing for SC Rheindorf Altach.

References

1977 births
Living people
Austrian footballers
Association football defenders
SC Rheindorf Altach players
SC Austria Lustenau players
People from Feldkirch, Vorarlberg
Footballers from Vorarlberg